Mikhail Vladimirovich Mishustin (born 3 March 1966) is a Russian politician and economist serving as the prime minister of Russia since 16 January 2020. He previously served as the director of the Federal Taxation Service from 2010 to 2020.

President Vladimir Putin nominated Mishustin to become prime minister on 15 January 2020, following the resignation of Dmitry Medvedev and the rest of the government to allow for sweeping constitutional changes. Hearings on his appointment took place in the State Duma on 16 January, and he was confirmed in office that day.

Early life and education
Mikhail Mishustin was born on 3 March 1966 in Lobnya, a town very close to Moscow, to the Mishustin family, Vladimir Moiseyevich and Luiza Mikhailovna. His mother was born in the city of Kotlas in the Arkhangelsk region while Mishustin's father, a Jew from Belarus, was born in Polotsk. Vladimir Moiseyevich Mishustin was a member of the Central Committee of the Komsomol.

In 1989, he graduated from the STANKIN, majoring in system engineering, and then in 1992, he completed postgraduate studies at the same institute.

Early career
After finishing graduate school, he began working as a director of a test laboratory facility. In 1992, Mishustin began working at the International Computer Club (ICC), where he worked on facilitating the integration of Russian and Western information technologies. He ultimately headed the board of the International Computer Club.

In 1998, he joined the state service as an assistant for information systems for accounting and control over the receipt of tax payments to the head of the State tax service of the Russian Federation. From 1998 to 2004, he worked as Deputy tax minister, being second-in-command at the State Tax Service. He worked as head of the Federal Agency for Real Estate Cadastre within the Russian Ministry of Economic Development, and head of the Federal Agency for Managing Special Economic Zones.

In 2008, Mishustin left the civil service and returned to the private sector. He spent two years as the president of UFG Asset Management, an investment fund, before resigning to become head of the Federal Tax Service.

In February 2009, he joined the personnel reserve of the President of Russia.

Director of the Federal Taxation Service

In 2010, Mishustin was appointed head of the Federal Tax Service (FTS) by then–Prime Minister Vladimir Putin. After his appointment to this post, entrepreneurs expressed the hope that Mishustin, as coming from business, would be more "friendly" to Russian entrepreneurs. As head of the Federal Tax Service,  Mishustin earned a reputation as a skilled technocrat and emphasized tax simplification and electronic tax services. During this period, however, the tax service was criticized for its overly strict approach to business; Mishustin rejected this criticism, pointing to a decrease in the number of on-site tax audits and tax inspections of large and medium-sized businesses.

As head of the FTS, Mishustin declared war on "dirty data" and targeted problems with unjustified value-added tax (VAT) refunds. Mishustin emphasized digitization and big data, making extensive use of "techno-authoritarian" systems of government surveillance of economic activity, including the collection of data on almost every transaction in Russia. This data collection was facilitated by new legislation that required all business-to-business invoices to be submitted to the government and required all retailers to automatically transmit real-time transaction data to tax authorities through an "online cash register" process. The government used artificial intelligence to identify persons suspected of tax evasion. This system of surveillance resulted in a decrease in the share of VAT uncollected by Russian authorities during Mishustin's tenure; the "VAT gap" reportedly declined from 20% to less than 1%).

Prime minister

Appointment

Prime Minister Dmitry Medvedev, along with his entire Cabinet, resigned on 15 January 2020, after President Vladimir Putin delivered the Presidential Address to the Federal Assembly, in which he proposed several amendments to the constitution. Medvedev stated that he was resigning to allow Putin to make the significant constitutional changes suggested by Putin regarding shifting power away from the presidency. Putin accepted the resignation. However, on Putin's instructions, the Cabinet continued its work as a caretaker cabinet until the formation of a new government.

On 15 January 2020, Putin nominated Mishustin for the post of Prime Minister. According to Putin, he was offered four candidates, but Mishustin was not among them. As a result Putin independently decided to nominate Mishustin for the Prime Minister. The next day he was confirmed by the State Duma to the post and appointed Prime Minister by Putin's decree. This was the first time ever that a Prime Minister was confirmed without any votes against.

Cabinet

On 21 January 2020, Mishustin presented to President Vladimir Putin a draft structure of his Cabinet. On the same day, the President signed a decree on the structure of the Cabinet and appointed the proposed Ministers.

The cabinet contained multiple members from Medvedev's Second Cabinet. Only four Deputy Prime Ministers remained (three retaining their positions and one being appointed to another post), along with twelve Ministers.

According to many political analysts, Mishustin is the only one of Putin's Prime Ministers who truly formed his "own" cabinet. He gathered a team of his own people and associates. Before that, in the 21st century, only Putin was able to do this. In particular, two Deputy Prime Ministers were deputies of Mishustin in the Federal Tax Service. According to experts, this means that Mishustin has been given carte blanche for changes.

On 26 March 2020, Mishustin proposed to restore the Government's Presidium, a body in the structure of the Cabinet formed to solve operational issues. Previously, such a body existed in Medvedev's First Cabinet, but had been abolished in Medvedev's Second Cabinet.

Term
Mishustin cut the Federal budget for 2020 to 2022, in correspondence to the 2020 Presidential Address to the Parliament. Mishustin engaged in the digital economy and promised support to large companies. He also suggested creating a common electronic income database for Russians, where all citizens incomes will be tracked. 
 
Since February 2020, Mishustin has started traveling around the country to make a real assessment of living conditions in various regions and identify issues on which it is necessary to strengthen work. Before the start of the coronavirus pandemic, Mishustin managed to visit four regions: Novgorod, Kurgan, Yaroslavl and Kostroma oblasts. In July 2020, after a decline in the active spread of the virus and the lifting of restrictions related to the pandemic, Mishustin resumed his trips, visiting Tatarstan.

COVID-19 pandemic

On 27 January 2020, Mishustin instructed the formation of an operational headquarters for the prevention of COVID-19 on 29 January, approved its composition. Deputy Prime Minister Tatyana Golikova was appointed its chief. On 30 January, he signed an order to close the borders with China in the Russian Far East. On 18 February, Mishustin signed an order banning Chinese citizens from entering Russia. The ban has been in effect since 20 February.

On 14 March, Mishustin created a Coordinating Council for the fight against coronavirus, which he personally headed. The next day, by presidential decree, a working group of the State Council was created, headed by Moscow Mayor Sergey Sobyanin. However, according to Dmitry Peskov, Mishustin's Coordinating Council is more important than Sobyanin's Working Group.

Since 16 March 2020, flights to and from the European Union, Norway and Switzerland are limited to regular flights between capital cities (or Geneva in case of Switzerland) and Moscow Sheremetyevo Airport, and charter flights. Mishustin furthermore announced the closure of the border with Belarus for the movement of people, for which he was criticized by Belarusian President Alexander Lukashenko, and an entry ban for foreigners imposed from 18 March to 1 May. In addition, borders with other countries bordering Russia were also closed.

On 18 and 19 March, Mishustin announced measures to support business. In particular, he instructed to defer the payment of taxes for travel agencies and airlines, as well as to defer insurance premiums for small businesses. On 19 March, he also announced the government's control over food and drug prices due to the coronavirus. It also temporarily lifted all restrictions on the supply of essential goods. On 20 March, Mishustin proclaimed that flights to the United States, United Kingdom and United Arab Emirates would be restricted. On the same day, Mishustin announced that six drugs for the treatment of COVID-19 had been developed in Russia and were being tested.

On 27 March, as a follow-up to Putin's address to the nation, Mishustin ordered all reservations at pensions or holiday houses to be cancelled from 28 March to 1 June, recommended regional authorities to close all the pistes at resorts for the same period, instructed them to force all the public eating places (except for delivery services) to suspend activities from 28 March to 5 April, and recommend the citizens to refrain from travelling.

On 30 March, as Moscow and Moscow Oblast declared a lockdown, Mishustin urged all regions to follow the example and take similar measures. He also announced a bill that would raise fines for breaching quarantine requirements. On 1 April, Mishustin and the Minister of Communications Maxut Shadayev announced creating a system of tracking quarantine violation based on data of mobile network operators. Violators will receive a text message, and if they breach it systematically, the information will be sent to the police.

After testing positive for COVID-19 on 30 April, he suggested to President Putin that his deputy Andrey Belousov be appointed to take over for him as the acting Prime Minister. Putin signed a decree to that effect, appointing Belousov to the role on an acting basis, following Mishustin's recommendation. After recovering, Mishustin resumed discharging his duties as Prime Minister on 19 May, following Putin signing a decree permitting him to do so. He was the highest-ranking Russian official and the second head of government in the world (after British PM Boris Johnson) to become infected with the virus.

Economic recovery plan
On 1 June 2020, Mishustin announced that a national plan to restore the economy, employment and income of the population after the coronavirus pandemic is ready and on 2 June he presented the plan to President Putin. The plan includes 3 stages, 9 sections, 30 priority areas and about 500 events. According to the plan, the recovery of the economy was given one and a half years - until the end of 2021. The goals of the plan are to achieve sustainable growth in real incomes, reduce the unemployment rate to less than 5%, and ensure that GDP growth rates are at least 2.5% per year.

Domestic policy

IT industry

In June 2020, Mishustin proposed a tax maneuver for IT companies in order to reduce the load and create a comfortable competitive regime in this area. President Putin supported this idea and instructed the government to work on it. As part of the maneuver, Mishustin proposed to reduce the income tax on IT companies from 20% to 3%, as well as to reduce insurance premiums from 14% to 7.6%. On June 23, Putin officially announced the tax maneuver prepared by Mishustin.

On 9 July 2020, Mishustin visited Tatarstan where he took part in the IT conference, where he met with the managers of the country's leading IT companies. During his speech, Mishustin spoke about the government's program for the development of the IT industry, which includes a new tax regime, support for innovation, assistance to startups, development of public-private partnerships, etc. According to him, the Russian jurisdiction should become the most attractive for IT companies. Mishustin stated: "It is obvious that following the leaders of digitalization leads countries to a new digital dependence. Russia cannot afford to take a place among the depend countries, which means that we have no choice, we must go forward and be leaders."

Transport

On 10 July 2020, during his trip to Tatarstan, Mishustin launched the construction of the Moscow – Kazan highway, which will become part of the route Europe - Western China. Mishustin called this construction the largest road project in Russia. Given the significance of the project (which is one of the parts of the plan to restore the economy after the coronavirus crisis), Mishustin instructed to launch the highway in 2024, which is three years earlier than originally planned. For this purpose, he promised to allocate additional funds. In addition, he instructed Transport Minister Yevgeny Dietrich to work on the issue of extending the highway to Yekaterinburg by 2030.

Administrative reform
On 16 November 2020, Mishustin announced an administrative reform aimed at optimizing the state apparatus and its efficiency. As part of the reform, it is planned to reduce the number of civil servants (mainly at the expense of positions that remain vacant), and bring the structure of Federal Executive bodies to uniform standards. It is also planned to reorganize the majority of federal state unitary enterprises. According to the draft, they should be liquidated or transformed into joint-stock companies with further privatization.

On 23 November 2020, Mishustin also announced the optimization of the so-called development institutions (state funds, agencies and companies engaged in stimulating innovation processes using public-private partnership mechanisms). As part of this reform, it is planned to form an investment block based on VEB.RF, with the transfer of a number of the development institutions under its management, as well as the direct transfer of the functions of the abolished institutions to it.

Foreign policy

According to the BBC, "Prime Minister Mikhail Mishustin has the unenviable task of rescuing the economy but has little say over" the 2022 Russian invasion of Ukraine. According to sources close to the Kremlin, Mishustin was unaware of Putin's plans to launch a full-scale invasion of Ukraine and does not want to be associated with the war.

Sanctions 

Sanctioned by New Zealand in relation to the 2022 Russian invasion of Ukraine.

Personal life
Mishustin is married and has three sons. He plays ice hockey. He is also an avid spectator of the sport, and is a member of the supervisory board of HC CSKA Moscow. It has been reported that, prior to his selection as Prime Minister, he and Putin developed a rapport with each other through their shared enthusiasm for the sport. Mishustin is an amateur musician, and is a pianist. As a hobby he has written pop music, including for the singer Grigory Leps. On 30 April 2020, Mishustin tested positive for the SARS-CoV-2 virus amidst the COVID-19 pandemic in Russia. He informed President Vladimir Putin of his infection via a video-call. He also stated that he was going into self-quarantine. Putin expressed sympathy and wished him a quick recovery. Mishustin was the first high-ranking Russian official to disclose his coronavirus infection to the public. His diagnosis also made him the most high-profile political figure in Russia to contract the coronavirus.

Wealth 
Mishustin's family owns real estate valued at $48.2 million in the Moscow area. The real estate is held by his father (Vladimir Mishustin), two oldest sons, and sister (Natalya Stenina).

On 16 January 2020, the Russia-based Anti-Corruption Foundation called on Mishustin to explain how his wife earned almost 800 million rubles (nearly £10 million) over 9 years. On 19 January, the Kommersant newspaper published a detailed analysis of all the financial activities of Mishustin, including his leadership of UFG Invest — one of the country's largest investment companies. When switching to the civil service in 2010, Mishustin, in accordance with the law, transferred all his assets and investment projects to his wife. Following the transfer, Vladlena Mishustina began receiving dividends, which is confirmed by official declarations. According to Kommersant, a significant part of the assets were sold in 2013 and 2014, and the proceeds were placed in deposit accounts to receive interest.

Mishustin's sister Natalya Stenina was married to Alexander Evgenievich Udodov from 2008 until 18 December 2020. According to Alexei Navalny, Udodov was the beneficial owner of several apartments in the 20 Pine Street building in New York City that were purchased in December 2009 within 3 weeks of when Denis Katsyv's Prevezon Holdings, which was stolen from Sergei Magnitsky, acquired several properties in the same building near Wall Street in the New York City Financial District. Udodov relinquished control of these properties in 2018.

Awards 

 Order of Honour (29 December 2012)
 Russian Federation Presidential Certificate of Honour (15 November 2013)
 Order "For Merit to the Fatherland" (16 July 2015)

Foreign 

  - Gold Medal of Honour of the City of Athens (25 March 2021)

Ecclesiastical 

 Patriarchal Badge of the Temple Builder (25 June 2017)
 Order of the Venerable Seraphim of Sarov III degree (28 August 2019)

Ranks 

 Acting State Advisor to the Russian Federation, 1st class (5 December 2010)

References

External links

Official site of the Prime Minister of Russia

1966 births
Heads of government of the Russian Federation
1st class Active State Councillors of the Russian Federation
Russian nationalists
Independent politicians in Russia
Anti-Ukrainian sentiment in Russia
Russian people of Jewish descent
Russian people of Belarusian-Jewish descent
Living people
Politicians from Moscow
21st-century Russian politicians
Heads of the Federal Tax Service
COVID-19 pandemic in Russia
Russian individuals subject to the U.S. Department of the Treasury sanctions
Specially Designated Nationals and Blocked Persons List
People of the 2022 Russian invasion of Ukraine